Anisodactylus is a genus of ground beetle native to the Palearctic (including Europe), the Near East and North Africa. It contains the following species:

 Anisodactylus afghanus Schauberger, 1929 
 Anisodactylus agricola (Say, 1823) 
 Anisodactylus alternans (Motschulsky, 1845) 
 Anisodactylus amaroides Leconte, 1851 
 Anisodactylus anthracinus (Dejean, 1829) 
 Anisodactylus antoinei Puel, 1931 
 Anisodactylus binotatus (Fabricius, 1787) 
 Anisodactylus caenus (Say, 1823) 
 Anisodactylus californicus Dejean, 1829 
 Anisodactylus carbonarius (Say, 1823) 
 Anisodactylus consobrinus Leconte, 1851 
 Anisodactylus darlingtoni Noonan, 1973 
 Anisodactylus discoideus Dejean, 1831 
 Anisodactylus dulcicollis (Laferte-Senectere, 1841) 
 Anisodactylus emarginatus N.Ito, 2003 
 Anisodactylus furvus Leconte, 1863 
 Anisodactylus haplomus Chaudoir, 1868 
 Anisodactylus harpaloides (Laferte-Senectere, 1841) 
 Anisodactylus harrisii Leconte, 1863 
 Anisodactylus heros (Fabricius, 1801)  
 Anisodactylus hispanus Puel, 1931 
 Anisodactylus intermedius Dejean, 1829
 Anisodactylus karennius (Bates, 1892) 
 Anisodactylus kirbyi Lindroth, 1953 
 Anisodactylus laetus Dejean, 1829 
 Anisodactylus lodingi Schaeffer, 1911 
 Anisodactylus mandschuricus Jedlicka, 1942 
 Anisodactylus melanopus (Haldeman, 1843) 
 Anisodactylus merula (Germar, 1824) 
 Anisodactylus nemorivagus (Duftschmid, 1812) 
 Anisodactylus nigerrimus (Dejean, 1831) 
 Anisodactylus nigrita Dejean, 1829 
 Anisodactylus nivalis G.Horn, 1880 
 Anisodactylus opaculus (Leconte, 1863) 
 Anisodactylus ovularis (Casey, 1914) 
 Anisodactylus pitychrous Leconte, 1861 
 Anisodactylus poeciloides (Stephens, 1828) 
 Anisodactylus porosus (Motschulsky, 1845) 
 Anisodactylus pseudagricola Noonan, 1996 
 Anisodactylus pueli Schauberger, 1933 
 Anisodactylus punctatipennis A.Morawitz, 1862 
 Anisodactylus rotundangulus Bates, 1878 
 Anisodactylus rudis (Leconte, 1863)  
 Anisodactylus rusticus (Say, 1823) 
 Anisodactylus sadoensis Schauberger, 1931 
 Anisodactylus sanctaecrucis (Fabricius, 1798) 
 Anisodactylus signatus (Panzer, 1796) 
 Anisodactylus similis Leconte, 1851 
 Anisodactylus texanus Schaeffer, 1910 
 Anisodactylus tricuspidatus A.Morawitz, 1863 
 Anisodactylus verticalis (Leconte, 1848) 
 Anisodactylus virens Dejean, 1829

References

External links
Anisodactylus at Fauna Europaea

 
Taxa named by Pierre François Marie Auguste Dejean